The National Patriotic Front of Liberia (NPFL) was a Liberian rebel group that initiated and participated in the First Liberian Civil War from 1989 to 1996.

Leadership
The military aspects of NPFL were led by Charles Taylor, a former government official who was being sought for trial on charges of corruption, the NPFL took up arms against the regime of Samuel Doe on 24 December 1989. Most NPFL fighters were originally drawn from the Gio and Mano ethnic groups of northern Liberia who were persecuted under Doe's regime.

Ellen Johnson Sirleaf served as International Coordinator of the NPFL. Taylor and Tom Woewiyu were also in leadership positions.

Martina Johnson was one of the NPFL commanders who is alleged to have “participated directly in mutilation and mass killing in late 1992 during an NPFL offensive known as ‘Operation Octopus’.

Support

Popular support within Liberia helped the group grow from an initial force numbering in the low hundreds to a large irregular army that occupied around 80% of the country in less than a year.

NPFL efforts to capture the capital city of Monrovia were thwarted by the arrival of the Economic Community of West African States (ECOWAS) cease-fire monitoring group, ECOMOG. They instead set up in 1991 an alternative national administration (the National Patriotic Reconstruction Assembly Government - NPRAG) based in the Bong County town of Gbarnga. Taylor's authority as self-proclaimed head of the NPRAG was, however, challenged by a breakaway faction, known as the Independent National Patriotic Front of Liberia (INPFL), led by Prince Yormie Johnson, whose troops, estimated to number less than 500, rapidly gained control of parts of central Monrovia.

Operation Octopus
In late 1992, the NPFL launched "Operation Octopus" which was repulsed by combined ECOMOG, Armed Forces of Liberia (AFL) and United Liberation Movement of Liberia for Democracy (ULIMO) forces. Another NPFL breakaway group, the National Patriotic Front of Liberia-Central Revolutionary Council (NPFL-CRC), emerged in mid-1994. Prominent figures in the faction were Sam Dokie and Tom Woewiyu, a defense chief in Taylor's alternative government. Both men cited strategic and ideological differences as the cause of their defection.
Following negotiations, rebel group members occupied positions in the transitional government, but fighting continued well into early 1996.

The warring factions signed the ECOWAS-mediated Abuja Accord supplement on 17 August 1996, resulting in an immediate cessation of military hostilities.

Membership
The NPFL was estimated to have around 25,000 combatants and has orchestrated a wide range of human rights abuses including massacres, torture, kidnapping and a number of political assassinations. In addition to the war in Liberia, the rebel group sponsored Revolutionary United Front (RUF) subversion against the military government in Sierra Leone, partly as a strategy to gain control of the local trade in diamonds.

Political aspirations
In preparation for upcoming elections that would take place in 1997, the NPFL reorganized itself into a civilian political party known as the National Patriotic Party (NPP). Charles Taylor and the NPP won the 19 July 1997 election with a substantial majority. While international observers deemed the polls administratively free and transparent, they noted that it had taken place in an atmosphere of intimidation because most voters believed that Taylor would resume the war if defeated.

References

Further reading

 Stephen Ellis, The Mask of Anarchy, 2001
 http://www.wri-irg.org/programmes/world_survey/reports/Liberia
 Global Witness, Taylor-made: The Pivotal Role of Liberia's Forests and Flag of Convenience in Regional Conflict, September 2001
 Käihkö, Ilmari. "Bush Generals and Small Boy Battalions: Military Cohesion in Liberia and Beyond." (PhD thesis, Uppsala, 2016).

History of Liberia
Rebel groups in Liberia
Dan people
Mano people